The Mansion of Madness (Spanish: La mansión de la locura) is a 1973 Mexican horror film directed by Juan López Moctezuma, in his directorial debut, and starring Claudio Brook, Arthur Hansel, Ellen Sherman, and Martin LaSalle. Set in 19th-century France, the film follows a journalist visiting a rural insane asylum in which he uncovers that the inmates have overtaken the doctors and staff, and implemented a series of gruesome treatments. It is loosely based on the Edgar Allan Poe short story  The System of Doctor Tarr and Professor Fether.

The film was released under the alternative titles House of Madness in the United Kingdom, and in the United States as Dr. Tarr's Torture Dungeon.

Surrealist artist Leonora Carrington supervised sets and costumes. The film's producer, Roberto Viskin, has previously produced Alejandro Jodorowsky's surrealist film El Topo (1970).

The film was a Mexican production and was shot in Mexico, using a mostly Mexican cast and crew. It was filmed in English and then dubbed into Spanish for Mexican cinemas.

Plot
In 19th-century France, journalist Gaston LeBlanc embarks to a sprawling, remote psychiatric hospital in the mountains where a Dr. Maillard has purportedly invented revolutionary treatments for the mentally ill. Driven by carriage, Gaston is accompanied by Julien Couvier and his wife, Blanche but they depart after being confronted by several aggressive, bizarre guards at the hospital's gated entrance, which terrifies Blanche.

Gaston meets Dr. Maillard and his beautiful niece, Eugénie. Gaston quickly observes that the patients of the hospital appear to roam free, acting out in maniacal and at times violent ways, as well as engaging in religious cult-like activities, which Maillard encourages. Meanwhile, the carriage carrying Julien and Blanche is attacked by a gang of men who kill the driver, causing Julien and Blanche to flee into the woods on foot. Blanche is caught and brutally raped, and Julien is also captured and tortured by the men.

Gaston has a hallucinatory dream his first night at the asylum, and later accuses Maillard of being an imposter, abusing his patients as well as controlling Eugénie. Maillard responds that, despite her calm countenance, Eugénie is far more dangerous and violent than she appears. As Gaston observes the increasingly eccentric methods of Maillard's "soothing system", he begins to question the mental stability of the doctor. In the doctor's dungeon, innocent people are chained, tortured and stuck in glass cages, then forced to take part in gruesome games of ritual slaughter.

Maillard organizes a ritualized Dionysian cult-like gathering with himself as the ringleader, which Gaston is invited to attend. Gaston is disturbed to see the patients abusing an elderly man, who is revealed to be Eugénie's father and one of the hospital staff who has been overtaken by the insane patients. Gaston attempts to stop the gathering, while several of the hospital staff manage to free themselves. Maillard is shot to death by one of the escaped female staff, who declares "Viva la révolution" before killing him. Gaston departs the asylum in a daze.

Cast
 Claudio Brook as Dr. Maillard / Raoul Fragonard
 Arthur Hansel s Gaston LeBlanc
 Ellen Sherman as Eugénie
 Martin LaSalle as Julien Couvier

Analysis
Film scholar  Doyle Greene cites The Mansion of Madness along with Moctezuma's Alucarda (1977) as "ground-breaking" for its blending of stylistic elements of classical horror with more contemporary surrealist and experimental visuals.

Production
Surrealist artist Leonora Carrington supervised sets and costumes with one of her sons, Gabriel Weisz. The repeated appearance of a white horse, Carrington’s alter ego, and the elaborate surreal feasts and costumes has been credited as demonstrating the artist’s vision and several of her recurring motifs. The film's producer, Roberto Viskin, has previously produced Alejandro Jodorowsky's surrealist film El Topo (1970).

Release

Critical response
Scream magazine reviewed The Mansions of Madness in 2016, writing that "if you manage to see beyond its jarring shortcomings, you will be treated to a film that is not only visually stunning, but which also leaves you with a frisson of disturbing melancholy that will haunt you for days to come." In a review of the Mondo Macabro release, DVD Talk noted that "Mondo Macabro's package text does its best to hype the film, which is described as "Like a Monty Python film directed by Fellini ... on acid!" It's an impressive movie, even though it doesn't quite live up to that claim."

Awards

The Mansion of Madness won the Laceno d'oro prize and a Special Mention for Claudio Brook's performance at the XIV Avellino Neorealist and Avant-garde Film Festival, Italy; a Special Mention at the Brave New World Festival in Belgrade, Yugoslavia (1973); it was also awarded a Special Mention at the Locarno Festival, Switzerland (1973), and a Gold Medal at the Paris International Fantastic Film and Science Fiction Festival (1974).

Notes

References

Sources

External links
 
 La mansión de la locura at BFI

1973 films
1973 directorial debut films
1973 horror films
English-language Mexican films
Films based on works by Edgar Allan Poe
Films set in the 1800s
Films set in France
Films set in psychiatric hospitals
Mexican horror films
1970s Mexican films
1970s exploitation films
Films about cults